The Maryland Terrapins softball team represents University of Maryland, College Park in NCAA Division I college softball.  The team participates in the Big Ten Conference. The Terrapins are currently led by head coach Mark Montgomery. The team plays its home games at Maryland Softball Stadium located on the university's campus.

History

Coaching history

Awards
Big Ten Freshman of the Year
Jaeda McFarland, 2021

References

 
Big Ten Conference softball